Vinu Abraham, is an Indian short story writer, novelist, script writer and media person writing in Malayalam language hailing from Nedungadappally, near Thiruvalla in Pathanamtitta district of the south Indian state of Kerala. For the past 30  years he is based in Thiruvananthapuram, the capital city of Kerala. His short stories and articles appear regularly in Malayalam periodicals in Kerala. He has published 23 books so far and penned screenplays for 7 Films.
‘Nashtanayika', his most famous novel depicts the saga of the tragic life of Malayalam cinema’s first heroine P.K.Rosy  and the making of the first Malayalam cinema ‘Vigatha Kumaran’. The famous Malayalam film celluloid directed by Kamal starring Pritviraj, Mamtha and Chandni is the adaptation of ‘Nashtanaayika’.

He scripted Parudeesa which won the prize for ‘Best Dramatic Editing’ at Amsterdam International Film Festival. The movie also won for best screenplay at Mexico International Film Festival.

Worked as Kerala correspondent for 'The Week' English weekly for 19 years.

Awards and honours 
 2015 State bank of Travancore award for the best short story collection - Nilavinte Naghangal (the nails of moonlight)
 Premji short story award  - Gabriela Sabatini Jeevitham Ezhuthumpol (When Gabriela Sabatini writes life )
 K.A Kodungaloor short story award  -Thottavarude Theengriham (The dining house of the defeated)
 The best screenplay award at Mexico International Film Festival for the film Parudeesa (the paradise, directed by R. Sharath )
 National film award (Indian president's silver medal ) for the best debut documentary (as producer )  - An encounter with a life living
 Was the member of Kerala sahitya academy general council 
 Was the youngest member (at 29yrs ) of Kerala University Board of Studies for journalism
 Was 4 times member of Kerala state television wards jury
 K.Madhavankutty award from Trivandrum Press Club for the best English media feature-4 times.
 V.Krishnamoorthy award from Trivandrum Press Club for the best English news report-2 times

Bibliography 
 Aaradhanapoorvam shatru ( the enemy with adoration) - short stories - current books, kottayam
 Punyavaalan paranju : Albuthangalude kaalam kazhinjirikkunu( the saint said the era of miracles are over )- short stories - DC books
 Gabriela Sabatini jeevitham ezhuthumpol (when Gabriela Sabatini writes life) - mathurbhoomi books- short stories
 Oru swaadnottakkarante bhakhshana paryavekshanangal (the culinary explorations of a gourmet )- Short novel- Haritham Books
 Sreenivasan oru pusthakam (sreenivasan : a book ) - edited book on actor and writer sreenivasan - Olive Books
 Kazhuthapulikalude chiri (the laughter of the hyeanas ) - short stories - DC Books
 Nashtanayika (The lost heoine )- current books, Thrissur and new edition by chintha books.
 Daivavela (divine work )- short stories - DC Books
 P Padmarajan -biography - Kerala Basha Institute 
 Nilavinte naghangal(the nails of moonlight)- short stories DC Books
 Chooppa- children's novel- DC Books
 K Surendran -Biography -Kerala Basha Institute  
 Pranayavazhinji (The river of love) - Novel - DC Books
 Athithi Devo Bhava (The guest is God )- short novel -Haritham books
 K.G George - Biography- Chintha books
 Ezhuthu, Vaayana, Jeevitham (writing, reading, life )- Autho bio-graphical articles - mathurbhoomi books
Cinemaksharangal-Articles on cinema-Sahithya Pravarthaka Sahakarana Sanghom NBS
Writerukunnu- Literary observations and autobiographical writings-Poorna Publications
Kavalmalakha(Guardian Angel)-Stories-DC Books
Adholokagayakan(Underworld Crooner)-Stories-Saikatham Books
Koda(fog)- stories-D C Books
The Lost Heroine(translation of Nashtanaika)-novel-Speaking Tiger

Films 
 Rathinirvedham(Remake ) -Director - TK Rajeevkumar starring Swetha Menon and Sreejith Vijay
 Chattakkari (remake) - Director- Santosh Sethumadhavan starring Shamna Kasim and Hemanth Menon
 Parudeesa (story, screenplay and dialogue ), direction : R. Sarath starring Sreenivasan,Thampi Antony and Swetha Menon
 Celluloid ( story ), direction - Kamal  starring Prithviraj,Chandini and Mamtha Mohandas
 100 Degree Celsius (  dialogue ), director - Rakesh Gopan starring Swetha Menon,Meghana Raj,Bhama,Ananya
 Kathayulloru Pennu (Story, screenplay, dialogue ), director - P Musthafa starring Nuzarath Jahan
Aniyankunjum Thannalayath(Screenplay and Dialogue)-director-Rajivnath

References

External links 

Malayalam-language writers
Living people
Writers from Kerala
People from Thiruvalla
Year of birth missing (living people)